There are multiple valleys known as Moss Valley:

 Moss Valley, Wrexham, Wrexham in Wales
 Moss Valley, the valley carved out by The Moss, North East Derbyshire in England